Terrick is a hamlet in Buckinghamshire, England.

Terrick may also refer to:
 a hamlet in the Shire of Loddon, Victoria, Australia
 Terrick Terrick National Park, Victoria, Australia

People with the surname
 Richard Terrick (1710–1777), Church of England clergyman and bishop of London 
 Samuel Terrick (c.1602–1675), English politician